John Eric Stowe, O.F.M. Conv., (born April 15, 1966) is an American prelate of the Roman Catholic Church who has been the Bishop of Lexington in Kentucky since 2015.

Biography

Early life 
John Stowe was born in Amherst, Ohio, on April 15, 1966 to John and Lucy Stowe and grew up in Lorain, Ohio. After graduating from Lorain Catholic High School in 1984, he was admitted as a candidate to the Province of Our Lady of Consolation of the Order of Friars Minor Conventual. After Stowe  completed his Novitiate year and been admitted to the Order, he was sent to study at Saint Louis University in St. Louis, Missouri; he graduated with a double major in history and philosophy. He professed his solemn vows in the Order on August 1, 1992.

Stowe then pursued his seminary studies at the Jesuit School of Theology in Berkeley, California. He received the degrees of Master of Divinity and a Licentiate of Sacred Theology, specializing in church history.

Priesthood 
Stowe was ordained as a priest to the Franciscan Order by Auxiliary Bishop Alexander  Quinn on September 16, 1995.  After his ordination, Stowe assigned by his Province to serve in parishes in El Paso, Texas. In 2002, Stowe was invited by Bishop Armando Ochoa, bishop of El Paso to manage the diocesan chancery and to serve as his vicar general. He was later appointed as the chancellor of the diocese. In 2010, Stowe was elected vicar provincial of his Franciscan province. He was then given the additional responsibilities of rector of the Basilica and National Shrine of Our Lady of Consolation in Carey, Ohio.

Bishop of Lexington
On March 12, 2015, Pope Francis appointed Stowe bishop of the Diocese of Lexington. He received his episcopal consecration from Archbishop Joseph Kurtz with Bishops Armando Ochoa and Gabriel Enrique Montero Umaña as co-consecrators on May 5, 2015.

In February 2018, Stowe joined the Pax Christi USA Board as their president. In January 2019, Stowe wrote an op-ed that criticized Nick Sandmann and other students from Covington Catholic High School for sporting apparel supporting President Donald Trump during the 2019 March for Life rally in Washington, D.C. He said the slogan "Make America Great Again" on their clothing "supports a president who denigrates the lives of immigrants, refugees and people from countries that he describes with indecent words and haphazardly endangers with life-threatening policies".

In March 2021, Stowe expressed support for the federal Equality Act, proposed legislation that was opposed by the U.S. Conference of Catholic Bishops. He wrote that "As a Catholic bishop, I hate to see any form of harmful discrimination protected by law and it is consistent with our teaching to ensure that LGBTQ people have the protection they need."

See also

 Catholic Church hierarchy
 Catholic Church in the United States
 Historical list of the Catholic bishops of the United States
 List of Catholic bishops of the United States
 Lists of patriarchs, archbishops, and bishops

References

External links 
 Roman Catholic Diocese of Lexington

 

1966 births
Living people
People from Amherst, Ohio
Conventual Franciscan bishops
Conventual Friars Minor
Saint Louis University alumni
Jesuit School of Theology at Berkeley alumni
21st-century Roman Catholic bishops in the United States
Roman Catholic bishops of Lexington
People from Lorain, Ohio
Catholics from Ohio
Bishops appointed by Pope Francis